Roller sports competitions at the 2023 Pan American Games in Santiago, Chile are scheduled to be held at the Velodrome (artistic), Skating rink (speed skating) and Urban Sports Esplanade (skateboarding).

The artistic competitions will start on November 3 and finish on the 4th. Speed skating competitions will take place on the 4th and 5 November. Skateboarding will make its debut at this edition of the games, with competitions taking place on October 21 and 22.

14 medal events are scheduled to be contested, two in artistic, eight in speed skating and four in skateboarding. A total of 96 qualified to compete at the games.

Qualification

A total of 96 roller sports athletes will qualify to compete. 18 will qualify in artistic, 44 in speed skating and 34 in skateboarding. The 2021 Junior Pan American Games and the Pan American Championships for each discipline held in 2022 were used to determine the qualifiers. For skateboarding, the 2023 Olympic World Skateboarding Ranking will be used to determine the qualifiers.

Medal summary

Medalists
Artistic skating

Speed skating

Skateboarding

References

Events at the 2023 Pan American Games
Pan American Games
2023